To the Hilt: Story from the Wild East is a 2014 Macedonian action-adventure Western film directed by Stole Popov. The film takes place in Ottoman ruled Macedonia. The filming started in May, 2012 and scenes were shot in Bitola, Ohrid, Skopje, Demir Hisar, Štip and Prilep. It premiered in Skopje, in October 2014.

It was selected as the Macedonian entry for the Best Foreign Language Film at the 87th Academy Awards, but was not nominated.

Cast
 Inti Sraj - Tereza
 Sasko Kocev - Krsto	
 Martin Jordanoski - Filip	
 Toni Mihajlovski - Muzafer	
 Iskra Veterova - Ana	
 Senko Velinov - Boro	
 Miki Manojlovic - Bogdan	
 Nikola Kojo - Agent	
 Nikola Ristanovski - Cvetko	
 Dragan Spasov – Dac - Shishe	
 Gorast Cvetkovski - Kaval

See also
 List of submissions to the 87th Academy Awards for Best Foreign Language Film
 List of Macedonian submissions for the Academy Award for Best Foreign Language Film

References

External links 
 website
 

2014 films
2014 Western (genre) films
Macedonian-language films
English-language Macedonian films
2010s action adventure films